Balzac and the Little Chinese Seamstress is a 2002 Franco-Chinese romance drama film with dialogue in the Sichuan dialect directed by Dai Sijie and starring Zhou Xun, Chen Kun and Liu Ye. It premiered at the 2002 Cannes Film Festival on 16 May.

Based on the 2000 semi-autobiographical novel of the same title by Dai, the film revolves around two young Chinese boys of bourgeois background who were sent to a remote village in Sichuan province for three years of re-education during the Cultural Revolution. They both fell in love with a beautiful local girl, granddaughter of an old tailor and known to everyone as the Little Seamstress. During those years of intellectual oppression, the three found solace and liberation in a collection of banned translated novels by Western authors, among whom their favourite was Balzac. The film explores the themes of youth, love, and freedom in those dark times in China.

Plot
The film is set in a period between 1971 and 1974, during the later stage of the Chinese Cultural Revolution. Two city boys in their late teenage years, Luo Min (played by Chen Kun) and Ma Jianling (Liu Ye), are on their way to a remote village in the mountainous Sichuan province for re-education. Upon arrival, the boys are questioned on their "reactionary backgrounds" by the Chief (Wang Shuangbao), the village leader, in the presence of the other villagers. Luo's father turns out to be a dentist who had once fitted a false tooth for Chiang Kai-shek, while Ma's father is a doctor. The Chief also examines the boys' luggage and burns a cookbook, which he claims to be bourgeois. He is about to throw Ma's violin into the fire as well before he is stopped by Luo, who lies that the Mozart's Divertimento KV 334 Ma plays is a "mountain song" titled Mozart is Thinking of Chairman Mao.

The two boys are allocated a house and immediately join in the labours of the locals, which include transporting buckets of human waste used for fertilizer as well as working in the coal mine. One day, a young girl, granddaughter of a tailor from the neighbouring village and known to everyone as the Little Seamstress (Zhou Xun), comes by with her grandfather to listen to Ma play violin. Luo and Ma befriend the Little Seamstress and soon both fall in love with her. The girl, illiterate but hungry for knowledge, and the boys, vowing to transform her, devise a plan to steal a suitcase filled with banned translated Western novels from Four-Eyes (Wang Hongwei), another boy undergoing re-education in the village but bound to return to the city. Luo begins to read to the Little Seamstress every day, books including those by Stendhal, Kipling and Dostoevsky. But her favourite turns out to be Balzac.

The Little Seamstress soon falls in love with Luo. One day, as Luo is departing for the city on a two-month leave to visit his sick father, she tells him that she has a problem but does not elaborate. She later confides to Ma that she is pregnant, but population-curbing laws forbid marriage before 25 and abortion is illegal without a marriage certificate. Ma travels to the city to find a gynecologist who knows his father and begs the latter for help. The gynecologist is moved and agrees to travel to the village to perform a secret abortion. Upon Luo's return, life resumes as before.

One day, however, the Little Seamstress, now completely changed by the new ideas Luo and Ma have introduced her to, abruptly decides to leave the village to seek out "a new life," despite pleas from her grandfather and Luo. Later, in 1974, Luo and Ma both return to the city as well. Luo later becomes a professor in a dental institute in Shanghai, while Ma moves to France and becomes a professional violinist. In the late 1990s, when he sees on the news that the construction of the Three Gorges Dam will soon flood the village he spent three years in, Ma travels back in the hope of finding the Little Seamstress again. However, his efforts are futile and he brings back only a video recording of the village and the people, including the now aged Chief. As Ma meets up with his old friend Luo in Shanghai, the latter confesses an earlier failed attempt to search for the Little Seamstress in Shenzhen and Hong Kong. The film ends with a news clip of the flooded towns and villages and a scene of the three, back to their youth years, also submerged in water.

Cast
 Zhou Xun as Little Seamstress, a beautiful and illiterate village girl, granddaughter of a tailor
 Liu Ye as Ma Jianling, a city boy of bourgeois background sent to a remote village for re-education during the Cultural Revolution
 Chen Kun as Luo Min, boy in the same situation as Ma, close friend of Ma and lover of the Little Seamstress
 Wang Shuangbao as Chief, leader of the village
 Wang Hongwei as Four-Eyes, a boy in similar situation as Ma and Luo who appears to embrace Mao's teachings wholeheartedly

Awards and nominations
 Golden Globes, 2003
 Best Foreign Language Film (nominated)
 Istanbul International Film Festival, 2003
 Golden Tulip (nominated)
 Golden Horse Film Festival, 2003
 Best Screenplay Adaptation (nominated)
 Hong Kong Film Awards, 2004
 Best Asian Film (nominated)

DVD release
Balzac and the Little Chinese Seamstress was released on DVD on 29 November 2005 in the United States and distributed by Empire Pictures.

See also
 Chinese Cultural Revolution

References

Additional sources 

Further reading
Bloom, Michelle E.  Contemporary Franco-Chinese Cinema: Translation, Citation and Imitation in Dai Sijie's Balzac and the Little Chinese Seamstress and Tsai Ming-Liang's What Time Is It There? Quarterly Review of Film and Video, 2005 Oct-Dec; 22 (4): 311–25. 

Chevaillier, Flore.  "Commercialization and Cultural Misreading in Dai Sijie's Balzac et la Petite Tailleuse chinoise.Forum for Modern Language Studies; Jan2011, Vol. 47 Issue 1, pp. 60–74.

External links
 
 
 
 
 

2002 films
2002 romantic drama films
Chinese romantic drama films
French romantic drama films
2000s Mandarin-language films
Films based on Chinese novels
Films set in Sichuan
Films set in the 1970s
Films about the Cultural Revolution
Films directed by Dai Sijie
Films based on autobiographical novels
2000s French films
2000s Chinese films